Hope Rotherham (née Mansell) (6 April 1894 – 26 July 1981) was a croquet player from England.

Mrs Eustace Rotherham, as she was known, was one of only three women to have won the Open Championship, winning in 1960. She won the Women's Championship seven times (1952, 1953, 1955, 1959, 1963, 1964 and 1969).

As an administrator, Mrs Rotherham served on the Council of the Croquet Association from 1954 to 1981 and was a Vice-President from 1974 to 1981.

References

External links
The Croquet Records website

1894 births
1981 deaths
English croquet players
English sportswomen
British sports executives and administrators